Gian Carlo Fusco (1 July 1915 – 17 September 1984), sometimes spelled Giancarlo Fusco, was an Italian writer, journalist, screenwriter and occasional actor.

Biography 
Born in La Spezia, Fusco spent his childhood in a college in Lucca, and in 1935 he made his writing debut with the novel Biancherie, but the book was blocked by the Fascist censorship because considered defeatist. In 1949 he started his journalistic career working for the magazine Il Mondo, and in 1950 he began collaborating with L'Europeo; he then collaborated with a large number of publications, including L'espresso, II Giorno, Il Giornale d'Italia, ABC and Cronache.

As a writer, Fusco is best known for the semi-autobiographical novel  Le rose del ventennio, an ironical recount of the Fascist era. He was also active in the film industry as a screenwriter and an actor.

Books 
 Le rose del ventennio (1959).  
 La lunga marcia. Italianski, brava gente (1961). 
 Guerra d'Albania (1961).   
 Gli indesiderabili (1962).   
 Quando l'Italia tollerava (1965).  
 I mille e una notte. Storia erotica del Risorgimento (1974).  
 Duri a Marsiglia: ambienti e protagonisti della malavita romantica degli anni Trenta (1974). 
 Il gusto di vivere (1985).

Selected filmography

Further reading

References

External links 
 
  

1915 births
1984 deaths
People from La Spezia
Italian male novelists
20th-century Italian male writers
Italian male journalists
20th-century Italian screenwriters
Italian male screenwriters
Italian male film actors
20th-century Italian journalists